CYMA - Canadian Youth Mission to Armenia - is a volunteer-run humanitarian and student exchange program in support of Armenia created by Archbishop Hovnan Derderian and Ronald Alepian.

Program Description 

CYMA, the Canadian Youth Mission to Armenia, is a Canadian, volunteer led humanitarian and exchange program focused on redevelopment, community projects, humanitarian aid distribution and student exchange. CYMA was founded in late 1992 through a collaboration between Archbishop Hovnan Derderian, then primate of the Canadian Diocese of the Armenian Apostolic Church, and university student Ronald Alepian.

1993

The first CYMA "mission" took place in the summer of 1993 when 24 young Canadians spent a month in the Ararat region of the newly independent Armenia. The mission had three main projects:

The construction of a primary school. A . building left uncompleted after the fall of the Soviet Union was renovated and furnished in under 4 weeks by the volunteers and opened in late August 1993. It continues to operate today.
Distribution of aid to border villages affected by the War in Karabakh and to children and orphan members of the CFFA - Children's Fund for Armenia.
Visitations, aid and humanitarian relief to poor families in the Ararat Region.

1994

The summer of 1994 saw fifty participants from several cities across Canada, as well as individuals from Europe and the United States. These volunteers chose to take part in the renovation of a school and a monastery, establish a day camp for the young victims of the Nagorno-Kharabagh war, present a Christian outreach program, conduct home visitations and collect statistical data and anecdotal evidence regarding the forced Armenian exodus from Azerbaijan. Most importantly they chose to share and connect with the locals to raise spirits and give them hope to endure those difficult times and look forward to a brighter future.

1995

In a meeting with local school board officials, CYMA leaders identified Afshar High School for Honor Students as the main project. Local officials began renovating the building in the hopes of creating a school for higher learning to prepare bright and promising students in the region for university education. In September 1996, the school opened and the villages in the Ararat Region began to train their youth for the future. The alumni of the "Nor Tbrotz" school of Istanbul, Turkey donated a substantial amount of money for the realization of this project. The year also witnessed the start of the new Christian Outreach Program and Education, see below.

Also, CYMA participants renovated all of the floors of the Shirazloo village's high school and financed the reconstruction of the flooring in Shirazloo Kindergarten. From years of neglect, many of the floors were collapsing due to rotting of the wood in both establishments.

1996

The 1996 mission was dedicated to the renovation of an orphanage, as well as a day camp for children between the ages of eight and twelve. In the mountainous and enchanting site of Dilijian, participants found themselves on the grounds of the Meredi orphanage. The building was limited in capacity due to the unlivable state of some of the dormitories: floors were covered in dust and garbage, or contained major fissures, walls were on the verge of collapse, wallpaper was shredded and the exterior walls were compromised due to the faulty masonry during the original construction. An extensive renovation was carried out which resulted in an increase of the capacity of the orphanage.

As every year, CYMA had organized a day camp for disadvantaged children. During the day, CYMA volunteers participated with the kids in the regular classes organized by the orphanage for the children. The youth played games, music, taught arts & crafts and introduced many new sports to the orphans.

1997

Young Armenian Canadian students and workers participated in the Canadian Youth Mission to Armenia's fifth anniversary. The summer of 1997 was an all-out summer camp with children including visitations to local community houses and also the distribution of humanitarian aid.

1998

CYMA renovated Khor Virap and conducted day camps in Ararat.

1999

The CYMA mission of 1999 was the seventh pilgrimage to Armenia and took place in the village of Dzaghgatzor. Participants joined together from Canada, United States and Mexico to on a major renovation of a day camp known as George Makinisian Camp. Some of the tasks of the construction included, cleaning, removing existing furniture, scraping the wallpaper, chiseling the tiles from the walls, carving opening for wire and cable application to interior partition walls, sanding walls, window frames, doors and flooring, leveling the ground and digging a 200-meter water pipe line trench.

The day camp took place twice a week in the mornings for approximately 120 local children in Dzaghgatzor. The average class was 17 people with three or four CYMA participants as leaders of each class. During the course of the morning the participants interacted with the children by teaching them prayers, songs and poetry in both English and Armenian. In addition, the participants spent time with the kids through games, sports, arts and crafts.

COPE: Christian Outreach Program and Education 

One of CYMA's primary goals is to reach out to the people of Armenia. To do so, a religious outreach program named COPE was established where CYMA would provide spiritual guidance as well as basic humanitarian assistance to the families, by visiting them in small groups directly in their homes. The program allowed the introduction of the Armenian Church to families and the re-awakening of their spirituality.

Creation of CYMA 

CYMA operates under the auspices of the Canadian Diocese, but since its early days, enjoys the active participation and support of the various Armenian organizations in Canada, including the AGBU - Armenian General Benevolent Union.

It was founded in 1992 by Archbishop Hovnan Derderian and Founding Chairperson Ronald Alepian, then a 22-year-old university student.  When creating CYMA, Alepian formed an honorary Board of Directors to add credibility to the mission, which included the late Senator Jacques Hebert (founder of Canada World Youth) and the late Senator Shirley Maheu.  Hebert and Maheu gave counsel and direction to Alepian and the early CYMA leaders.

One of the first things done by the founding committee was to commission a logo to brand the program in the minds of the community.  The logo is highly recognizable within the Armenian community and remains a symbol of Canada's participation in the redevelopment of the new country.

Alepian was awarded the St. Gregory of Nareg Cross by Archbishop Derderian in 1993 for his work developing the CYMA program.

On-going mission 

CYMA continues to operate today, now working in direct collaboration with the Armenian Church Youth Organization.  It remains one of the most active youth projects within the Armenian community.

References

Armenian-Canadian culture
Youth organizations established in 1992
Youth organizations based in Canada
Religious organizations based in Canada
Foreign charities operating in Armenia